In Stereo is the eighth studio album recorded by Belgian pop band Clouseau. The album was produced by Jean Blaute and Kris Wauters, and released through EMI on 12 March 1999.

The album debuted at number one on the Belgium (Flanders) Ultratop 50 chart and remained at the top spot for seven weeks; it stayed in the top ten for 12 weeks, and spent a total of 25 weeks on the chart. It also spent ten weeks on the Netherlands GfK Dutch Chart, peaking at number 28.

In Stereo was certified Platinum (Belgium) on 23 April 1999.

Background
In Stereo continued the successful collaboration of the production team of Kris Wauters and Jean Blaute, along with personnel who had previously worked on Clouseau's other, highly successful, albums. The band had at their disposal a full string orchestra including brass, as well as a group of reputable songwriters including Jan Leyers, Frank Vander linden, and Piet Van den Heuvel.

The album was recorded between October and November 1998 at Synsound Studio in Brussels, Belgium.

Release
In Stereo was released through EMI on 12 March 1999.

Singles
Clouseau is best known for their ballads, and lead singer Koen Wauters was eager to release more lively, upbeat songs. However, "Heb ik ooit gezegd" ("Have I ever told you"), their cover of Van Morrison's romantic ballad "Have I Told You Lately", was chosen as the album's lead single. The song was released on 29 January 1999 and peaked on the Belgium Ultratop 50 at number seven, and peaked at number 68 on the Dutch charts. The song was certified Gold in Belgium.

The album's second single, "Niets meer" ("Nothing anymore"), was released on 5 February 1999. It peaked at number 29 on the Dutch charts, and remained on the charts for nine weeks.

The third single, "Altijd meer en meer" ("Always more and more"), was released on 20 August 1999. It peaked at number 39 on the Belgium Ultratop 50 chart, and remained on the chart for five weeks.

The album's final single, "Hoe lang nog" ("How long?"), was released on 26 November 1999, but did not chart.

Track listing
Track listing adapted from Hung Medien

Personnel
Personnel list adapted from The Belgian Pop & Rock Archives and the Flanders Music Centre

 Koen Wauters – lead vocals
 Kris Wauters – keyboards
 Jan Leyers - backing vocals
 Mark Vanhie - backing vocals
 Dany Caen - backing vocals
 Jean Blaute – guitar, Hammond organ, piano
 Eric Melaerts – guitar
 Kevin Mulligan – guitar
 Leonardo Amuedo – acoustic guitar
 Evert Verhees – bass guitar
 Vincent Pierins – bass guitar
 Walter Mets – drums
 Eddie Conard – percussion
 Thierry Crommen - harmonica
 Guyri Spies – orchestral arrangement
 Yannic Fonderi – loop, drum and synth programming

Chart performance
In Stereo debuted on the Belgium (Flanders) Ultratop 50 chart on 20 March 1999 at number one, becoming Clouseau's twelfth number one album on the Belgian Flemish charts. The song remained at the top spot for seven weeks, then finally dropped out of the top ten on 12 June 1999. It exited the chart at number 49 on 4 September 1999 after spending a total of 25 weeks on the chart, 12 of which were in the top ten, and seven of which were at the top of the Ultratop 50.

In the Netherlands, In Stereo entered the Dutch charts at number 81 on 20 March 1999, peaking three weeks later at number 28 on 3 April 1999. The song dropped out at number 78 on 22 May 1999, after a total of 10 weeks on the chart.

Charts

Weekly charts

Year-end charts

Certifications
In Stereo was certified Gold on 19 March 1999 for sales in excess of 10,000 units, and certified Platinum on 26 March 1999 for sales in excess of 20,000 units.

Other releases
In Stereo was re-released on 25 March 2011 as a "2 For 1" double CD, which also included the re-release of Clouseau's 2004 album Vanbinnen.

References

1999 albums
EMI Records albums
Clouseau (band) albums
Dutch-language albums